Soul Shoutin' is a collaboration studio album by organist Shirley Scott recorded in 1963 for Prestige and issued in 1964 as PRLP 7312. It also features her then husband, saxophonist Stanley Turrentine. In 1995, the album was reissued on the same CD along with The Soul Is Willing, featuring a different track order.

Track listing 

"Gravy Waltz" (Ray Brown, Steve Allen) - 4:27
"In the Still of the Night" (Cole Porter) - 7:04
"Deep Down Soul" (Turrentine) - 9:42
"Serenata" (Leroy Anderson, Mitchell Parish) - 8:01
"Soul Shoutin'" (Turrentine) - 5:41

Personnel 
 Shirley Scott - organ
 Stanley Turrentine - tenor saxophone
 Earl May - bass
 Grassella Oliphant - drums

References 

1964 albums
Albums recorded at Van Gelder Studio
Prestige Records albums
Albums produced by Ozzie Cadena
Shirley Scott albums